Joseph Lefever (April 3, 1760 – October 17, 1826) was a Democratic-Republican member of the U.S. House of Representatives from Pennsylvania.

Biography
Joseph Lefever was born in Strasburg Township in the Province of Pennsylvania, near Paradise.  He was elected as a Republican to the Twelfth Congress.  He died in Paradise Township, Pennsylvania, in 1826.  Interment in Carpenter's Graveyard.

Sources

The Political Graveyard

1760 births
1826 deaths
Politicians from Lancaster, Pennsylvania
Democratic-Republican Party members of the United States House of Representatives from Pennsylvania